Ludvík Vébr (born 20 April 1960) is a Czech rower who competed for Czechoslovakia in the 1972 Summer Olympics and in the 1976 Summer Olympics. Ludvík Vébr is also associate professor (docent) at Czech Technical University in Prague. He is expert in the road engineering.

He was born in Prague.

In 1976 he was the coxswain of the Czechoslovak boat which won the bronze medal in the coxed pairs event.

References

External links
 profile

1960 births
Living people
Czech male rowers
Czechoslovak male rowers
Coxswains (rowing)
Olympic rowers of Czechoslovakia
Rowers at the 1976 Summer Olympics
Olympic bronze medalists for Czechoslovakia
Olympic medalists in rowing
Medalists at the 1976 Summer Olympics
Academic staff of Czech Technical University in Prague
Transport engineers
Czech civil engineers
Rowers from Prague